Telecommunication Breakdown is an album by Emergency Broadcast Network. It was released in 1995 by TVT Records. The CD included three video tracks in addition to the audio, as well as a floppy disc that included AV editing software.

The music was produced by Jack Dangers, as a side project from his group Meat Beat Manifesto. The album features a number of guest performers: Brian Eno on "Homicidal Schizophrenic," with Jamie West-Oram of The Fixx on guitar; Bill Laswell contributed to "Shoot the Mac-10," with Grandmaster Melle Mel rapping.

Critical reception
The New York Times wrote: "Outrageous and aggressive, Breakdown is guaranteed to have you either laughing, dancing or running from the room in terror ... Emergency Broadcast Network has a CD-ROM vision that matches and, to an extent, deepens its sonic attack."

Track listing
"search" – 0:59
"Electronic Behavior Control System" – 4:33
"go to" – 0:12
"Sexual Orientation" – 3:06
"Station Identification" – 4:40
"Get Down Ver. 2.2"  – 3:45
"Shoot the Mac-10"  – 4:03
"You Have 5 Seconds to Complete This Section"  – 3:06
"Super Zen State (Power Chant No.3)" – 6:50
"State Extension"  – 1:15
"interruption"  – 0:23
"Dream Induction"  – 3:20
"transition"  – 0:06
"Electronic Behavior Control System Ver. 2.0"  – 2:24
"We Must Have the Facts" – 3:05
"interference" – 0:14
"3:7:8"  – 3:43
"Beginning of the End"  – 2:45
"Homicidal Schizophrenic (A Lad Insane)"  – 4:08
"end of audio program"  – 0:45

Video track listing
"Electronic Behavior Control System" - 5:33
"3:7:8" – 3:42
"Homicidal Schizophrenic (A Lad Insane)" – 4:17

References

1995 albums
Electronic albums by American artists
TVT Records albums
Albums produced by Jack Dangers